A weeping statue is a statue which has been claimed  to have shed tears or to be weeping by supernatural means. Statues weeping tears which appear to be blood, oil, and scented liquids have all been reported. Other claimed phenomena are sometimes associated with weeping statues such as miraculous healing, the formation of figures in the tear lines, and the scent of roses. These events are generally reported by Catholics, and initially attract pilgrims, but are in most cases disallowed by the Church as proven hoaxes.

Weeping statue and Marian apparition 

Reported weeping statues are most often sculptures of the Virgin Mary and are at times accompanied by claims of Marian apparitions. A notable example is the nature of the Our Lady of Akita apparitions that was unlike other cases, as the entire nation of Japan was supposedly able to view the statue of the Virgin Mary shed tears on national television.

Hoaxes and skepticism
Authorities of the Catholic Church have been very careful in their approach and treatment of weeping statues, and generally set very high barriers for their acceptance.
For instance when a statue of the popular Saint Padre Pio of Pietrelcina in Messina, Sicily, was found to have tears of blood one day in 2002, Church officials quickly ordered tests that showed the blood belonged to a woman and then dismissed the case as a hoax.

Skeptics point to the fact that making a fake weeping statue is relatively easy. Skeptics have provided examples of weeping statues that have been obvious hoaxes.

Weeping statues have also been dismissed by rationalists as a purely psychological and/or fraudulent phenomenon. The witnesses are said to be deluded by their own state of mind or strong group suggestion. In this altered state of mind, they believe they see something that isn't really there.

Another likely explanation attributes the so-called tears to condensation. The tears that statues appear to weep are actually beads of condensation accounted for by the statue being made from material of varying density, with condensation forming on the denser (colder) pieces (in this case the eyes).

A number of weeping statues have been declared fake by Catholic church officials.

In 1995, a Madonna statue appeared to weep blood in the town of Civitavecchia in Italy. About 60 witnesses testified to witnessing the phenomenon. The local bishop said that he himself had seen it weep. The blood on the statue was later found to be male. The statue’s owner, Fabio Gregori, refused to take a DNA test. After the Civitavecchia case, dozens of reputedly miraculous statues were reported.  Almost all were shown to be hoaxes, where blood, red paint, or water was splashed on the faces of the statues.

In 2008, church custodian Vincenzo Di Costanzo went on trial in northern Italy for faking blood on a statue of the Virgin Mary when his own DNA was matched to the blood.

In 2018, at the Our Lady Guadalupe Catholic Church in Hobbs, New Mexico, a Mary statue was reported to be producing tears. In July of that year, the Catholic Diocese of Las Cruces revealed that tests confirmed the tears in fact had the chemical composition of rose scented olive oil.

List of weeping statues

Plutarch, in chapter 38 of his Life of Coriolanus, discusses the phenomenon of weeping and bleeding statues, with special reference to the case of a statue of Fortuna addressing a crowd in Rome. According to Joe Nickell, "animated ones", or inanimate objects that are claimed to do things such as walking, changing facial expressions, or shedding tears, are most commonly statues in the Roman Catholic tradition. In the  Book of Daniel Chapter 14 verses 1-21 the story finds Daniel setting up a trap to catch priests who were sneaking into temples to eat the offerings left at the feet of the idol Bel, which was worshipped for its seeming ability to consume food and drink.

A very small number of weeping statues have been recognized by the Roman Catholic Church, e.g. in Syracuse the shedding of tears from a statue in the house of a married couple (August 29, 1953) was recognized by the Catholic bishops of Sicily on December 13, 1953. Chemist Luigi Garlaschelli of the University of Pavia, who has not examined the statue, which is behind glass, theorizes that the tears are due to capillary attraction with moisture seeping through a fault in the glaze of the plaster statue.

The following is a list of the more publicized claims. The veracity of these claims is difficult to establish and many have been declared hoaxes by Church officials.

Weeping paintings
Weeping paintings or icons are a related phenomenon, but to date not a single case of a weeping painting has been approved either by the Roman Catholic or Coptic churches and most instances have turned out to be hoaxes. However, in Eastern Orthodoxy, some cases such as a weeping St Michael icon in Rhodes have been taken as miraculous. 

As with weeping statues, the tears exuded are often said to be of a substance which appears to be similar to blood. A painting of the Virgin Mary is said to have exuded moisture from the eyes and the fingers at St. Nicholas Albanian Orthodox Church in Chicago on December 6, 1986. The event gained international attention and drew many onlookers to the church. The moisture ceased in July 1987, but resumed a year later at which time 19 other icons were said to have also started weeping after being "anointed" with the painting's moisture. A painting of Mary on plywood was said to have wept on March 10, 1992 in Barberton, Ohio; annual pilgrimages celebrating the event were still in practice as late as 2002. Another painting of the Virgin Mary which drew many visitors to Christ of the Hills Monastery near Blanco, Texas in the 1980s was said to weep myrrh, but was uncovered as a fraud in the 2000s.

See also
 Moving statues
 Marian apparition
 Perceptions of religious imagery in natural phenomena
 Milk Miracle

References

Further reading

External links
Italian Committee for the Investigation of Claims on the Paranormal 
Photographs of statues claimed to be weeping
James Randi, Investigating Miracles, Italian-Style Scientific American, February 1996 
Church Says Weeping Statues Fake
"The 'new' idolatry" Joe Nickell investigates and exposes numerous weeping statue hoaxes.
Why does The Madonna Weep? 

Crying
Statues
Miracles